This is a list of aviation-related events from 2011.

Deadliest crash
The deadliest crash of this year was a military accident, namely the 2011 Royal Moroccan Air Force C-130 crash, which crashed near Guelmim, Morocco on 26 July killing all 80 people on board. The deadliest commercial accident was Iran Air Flight 277, a Boeing 727 which crashed near Urmia, Iran on 9 January, killing 78 of the 105 people on board.

Events

January
1 January
Kolavia Flight 348, operated by Tupolev Tu-154B-2 RA-85588 of Kogalymavia catches fire while taxying for take-off at Surgut International Airport, Russia, killing three people, and injuring 43. The aircraft is destroyed by the fire.

5 January
An attempt is made to hijack Turkish Airlines Flight 1754 from Gardermoen Airport, Oslo to Atatürk International Airport, Istanbul. The hijacker was overpowered by other passengers on the flight and was arrested when the aircraft landed. The flight was being operated by Boeing 737-800 TC-JGZ.

9 January
Iran Air Flight 277, crashes while performing a go-around at Urmia Airport killing 77 of the 106 people aboard, and injuring 26 people. A total of 28 people survived. The aircraft involved in the accident was a Boeing 727-286Adv.

10 January
AirAsia Flight 5218, operated by Airbus A320-216 9M-AHH, sustained substantial damage in a runway excursion accident at Kuching Airport, Malaysia. All 123 passengers and six crew members survived. The Flight from Kuala Lumpur Subang International Airport to Kuching Airport. The flight landed on Kuching's runway 25 in heavy rain around but skidded to the right and went off the side of the runway. It came to rest in the grass with the nose gear dug in or collapsed.

14 January
A United States Air Force MQ-1 Predator unmanned aerial vehicle crashes in the sea off the Horn of Africa while trying to return to Djibouti–Ambouli International Airport in Djibouti, Djibouti. It is the first known accident involving either a Predator or an MQ-9 Reaper unmanned aerial vehicle near a civilian airport.

20 January
An Ecuadorian Air Force de Havilland Canada DHC-6 Twin Otter crashes near Tena, Ecuador, killing all six people on board.

21 January
British Airways and Iberia merge to form International Airlines Group (IAG), the world's third-largest airline in terms of annual revenue and the second-largest airline group in Europe. However, both airlines continue to operate under their previous brands.

24 January
Etihad Airways Flight 19, operated by Airbus A340-600 A6-EHH was escorted into Stansted Airport, United Kingdom by two Royal Air Force Typhoon aircraft from RAF Coningsby. The flight originated at Abu Dhabi International Airport and was bound for London Heathrow Airport when it was diverted due to an unruly passenger. The passenger was arrested after the aircraft had landed.

25 January
 Senegal Airlines begins flight operations.

February

2 February
An Indian Army HAL Cheetah helicopter crashed near Nashik, India, killing two crew.

9 February
 The United States Air Force announces that the C-17 Globemaster III is its first aircraft certified to fly on biofuel. The certification clears the C-17 to fly on a volumetric blend of up to 50 percent HRJ biofuel and 50 percent JP-8 conventional jet fuel or on a blend of 25 percent HRJ, 25 percent synthetic paraffinic kerosene fuel, and 50 percent JP-8. It also announces that it plans to complete flight testing of HRJ by February 2012 and to have all U.S. Air Force aircraft certified to use biofuels by December 2012.

10 February
Manx2 Flight 7100 from Belfast, operated by Fairchild Swearingen Metroliner EC-ITP leased from Flightline BCN of Barcelona, overturns on its third attempt to land at Cork, Republic of Ireland in fog, killing six and injuring six.
21 February
As violence in the Libyan Civil War grows, Libyan Air Force warplanes and attack helicopters launch airstrikes on protesters, reportedly targeting a funeral procession and a group of protesters trying to reach a military base.
Two senior Libyan Air Force pilots fly their Dassault Mirage F1 fighters to Malta and request political asylum after defying orders to bomb protesters. Two civilian helicopters also land in Malta after a flight from Libya, carrying seven passengers who claim to be French oil workers.
22 February
Former Libyan Ambassador to India Ali Abd-al-Aziz al-Isawi confirms that Libyan Air Force jets have bombed civilians.
23 February
 Ordered to strike targets in Benghazi, Libya, during the Libyan Civil War, the crew of a Libyan Arab Republic Air Force Sukhoi Su-22 NATO reporting name "Fitter") refuses to carry out the strike and instead ejects from the aircraft, leaving it to crash near the city.
27 February
 Indian merges into Air India.
28 February
Libyan rebels reportedly shoot down a Libyan Air Force warplane during the Battle of Misrata.

March
1 March
Australian Minister for Defence Stephen Smith says that international intervention in the Libyan Civil War to enforce a no-fly zone is probable, and British Foreign Secretary William Hague says that a no-fly zone could be imposed even without a United Nations Security Council resolution. Libyan rebel leaders debate whether to ask for Western airstrikes, and Abdul Fatah Younis, Libyas former minister of the interior who has defected to the rebels, says he would welcome targeted foreign airstrikes, though he offers the use of Libyan military airbases to foreign aircraft only in case of emergency.

2 March
 Two Libyan Air Force jets bomb Ajdabiya in an attempt to destroy a weapons depot. Anti-aircraft artillery shoots one of them down.
The Libyan oppositions interim-government council formally requests that the United Nations impose a no-fly zone over Libya and conduct precision air strikes against Libyan government forces, and the Arab League states that a no-fly zone is necessary and adds that in cooperation with the African Union, it could impose a militarily-enforced no-fly zone without the United Nations backing.

4 March
The Libyan Air Force conducts occasional air strikes on Ajdabiyas weapon-storage area, with no reported casualties.
Libyan opposition forces capture the Libyan airbase at Ra's Lanuf.

5 March
An Antonov An-148 crashes at Garbuzovo, Alxeevsky Region, Belgorod Oblast, Russia following an in-flight break-up. All six people on board are killed.
Opposition forces shoot down a Libyan Air Force jet fighter over Ra's Lanuf after it attempts to bomb the town, killing its two pilots.

9 March
The Space Shuttle Discovery, first of the space shuttles to be retired, glides to a landing to end its 39th and final mission – the most by any space shuttle.

11 March
Following the 2011 Tōhoku earthquake off the coast of Japan, Sendai Airport in Natori, Japan, is engulfed by a tsunami and put out of action. Flights are suspended from a number of airports in Japan, including Narita International Airport and Haneda Airport, Tokyo. In Hawaii, Hilo International, Honolulu International, Kahului and Lihue airports are all temporarily closed.

15 March
A U.S. Air Force MQ-1 Predator unmanned aerial vehicle overshoots the runway at Djibouti–Ambouli International Airport in Djibouti, Djibouti, and crashes into a fence. No one is injured. Investigators blame the accident on a melted throttle part and pilot confusion and inattention, as well as the inability of any remote pilot to react to cues such as wind rush or high engine pitch that would suggest to the pilot of a manned aircraft that the aircraft was approaching the runway too steeply and at too high a speed.

17 March
 United Nations Security Council Resolution 1973 approves a no-fly zone over Libya, authorizing military intervention in the Libyan Civil War. The resolution also prohibits flights to any United Nations member country by aircraft registered in Libya, so Afriqiyah Airways and Libyan Airlines both cease all flight operations.

18 March
The flight, which also included other maneuvers, is a major step forward toward the U.S. Air Force's goal of using alternative fuel blends derived from domestic sources to meet 50 percent of its domestic aviation fuel needs by 2016.

19 March
 Libyan rebel ground fire mistakenly shoots down a MiG-23BN (NATO reporting name "Flogger") of the rebel Free Libyan Air Force over Benghazi.
 French Air Force aircraft make the first attacks of the military intervention in Libya, striking Libyan government armored vehicles south of Benghazi during the Second Battle of Benghazi. United States Air Force B-2 Spirit bombers, American fighters, and Royal Air Force aircraft go into action later in the day, striking Libyan government ground forces and air defense sites.

20 March
 An airstrike by the international coalition against a Libyan government military ground convoy approaching Misrata destroys 14 tanks, 20 armored personnel carriers, and several trucks filled with ammunition, killing at least 14 Libyan government soldiers.

22 March
 A U.S. Air Force F-15E Eagle crashes in Libya due to a mechanical failure; its two-man crew survives with minor injuries. Libyan rebel forces rescue one of them; the other is picked up by a United States Marine Corps MV-22 Osprey from the amphibious assault ship , the first time an Osprey has been used to rescue a downed aviator.

23 March
 Coalition air strikes target Libyan government military forces in Misrata, at Ajdabiya's eastern gate, in eastern Tripoli, and at Tajura. They also hit Libyan leader Muammar Gaddafi's compound at Bab al-Aziziya. Royal Air Force Air Vice Marshal Greg Bagwell states that the Libyan Air Force "no longer exists as a fighting force" and that coalition aircraft are "operating with impunity" over Libya.

24 March
A French fighter aircraft destroys a Libyan government Soko G-2 Galeb military trainer aircraft on the ground just after it had landed at a Libyan base following a flight in which it violated the no-fly zone over Libya. French aircraft also bomb the Al Jufra Air Base.

25 March
French and British jets strike Libyan government tanks and artillery in eastern Libya to help rebel forces to take Ajdabiya.
The United Arab Emirates commits six F-16 Fighting Falcon and six Mirage fighters to help enforce the no-fly zone over Libya.

26 March
Coalition aircraft attack targets on the outskirts of Misrata, Libya.
France reports that at least five Libyan government Soko G-2 Galeb fighter planes and two Libyan government Mil Mi-24 (NATO reporting name "Hind") attack helicopters preparing to attack rebel forces in the Az Zintan and Misrata regions have been shot down in the last 24 hours.

28 March
British jets bomb ammunition bunkers in southern Libya and destroy 22 tanks, other armoured vehicles, and artillery pieces in the vicinity of Ajdabiya and Misrata.

28–29 March (overnight)
Coalition aircraft fly 115 strike sorties against targets in Libya.

29 March
A U.S. Navy Lockheed P-3 Orion fires at a Libyan Navy patrol vessel that has launched missiles at merchant ships in the port of Misrata. A U.S. Air Force A-10 Thunderbolt II attacks two smaller Libyan vessels accompanying the patrol vessel, sinking one and forcing the other to be abandoned.

30 March
 After a sandstorm prevents strikes the previous day, coalition aircraft begin attacks against Libyan government forces around Ra's Lanuf and on the road to Uqayla.

31 March
The United States turns over command of coalition operations in Libya to the North Atlantic Treaty Organization (NATO) and greatly reduces its participation in airstrikes there.
Coalition aircraft strike an eastern suburb of Tripoli, Libya, and attack Libyan government forces in Brega during the Third Battle of Brega.

April
1 April
In the Libyan Civil War, a coalition airstrike attacking a Libyan government ground convoy in eastern Libya causes a truck carrying ammunition to explode, destroying two nearby houses. Seven civilians die and 25 are wounded.
A Libyan rebel convoy near Brega fires into the air with an anti-aircraft gun, perhaps in celebration. A U.S. Air Force A-10 Thunderbolt II aircraft believing it was under attack by Libyan government forces then returns fire, killing at least 13 people.
Southwest Airlines Flight 812, the Boeing 737-3HR N632SW with 123 people on board, suffers an in-flight structural failure which opens a six-foot (1.8-meter)-long hole in its fuselage and triggers an explosive decompression and the deployment of oxygen masks. Only two people suffer minor injuries, and the airliner makes a successful emergency descent and landing at Yuma International Airport in Yuma, Arizona. Southwest Airlines grounds all 80 of its 737-300s for inspection.

4 April
 A Georgian Airways Canadair CL-600-2B19 Regional Jet CRJ-100ER (registration 4L-GAE) on behalf of the United Nations crashes in the Democratic Republic of the Congo after a flight from Goma International Airport to N'Djili Airport in Kinshasa, killing 32 of the 33 people on board.

5 April
The rest turn back.

7 April
Unaware that Libyan rebels had taken possession of any tanks, North Atlantic Treaty Organization (NATO) aircraft mistakenly strike a Libyan rebel tank convoy near Ajdabiya, killing thirteen and wounding many, Other NATO airstrikes mistakenly kill two rebels and wound 10 in Brega.

10 April
NATO announces that its airstrikes in Libya under Operation Unified Protector have destroyed 11 Libyan government tanks near Ajdabiya and 14 near Misrata during the day. Libyan rebels announce that NATO airstrikes have helped them hold Ajdabiya and drive Gaddafis forces out during the weekends attack.

11 April
NATO announces that its Operation Unified Protector airstrikes have destroyed 49 Libyan government tanks since 9 April, including 13 on 9 April 25 on 10 April, and 11 on 11 April.

12 April
The Air France Airbus A380 F-HPJD collides on the ground with the Comair Bombardier CRJ-700 N641CA at John F. Kennedy International Airport in New York City, spinning the CRJ-700 through 90°. The Airbus sustains slight damage, but the CRJ-700 is substantially damaged.

14 April
Coalition jets strike Tripoli, Libya, targeting a military base and damaging parts of a university complex. Libyan government antiaircraft artillery in central Tripoli fires at them.

21 April
The Sukhoi Superjet 100, the first airliner developed from start to finish in post-Soviet Russia, makes its first commercial passenger flight, flying for the Armenian airline Armavia from Yerevan, Armenia, to Moscow, Russia.

24 April
Libyan rebels claim that coalition airstrikes on Libyan government forces on the Al Zaitoniya–Al Soihat road near Ajdabiya hit 21 military vehicles but NATO does not confirm their claim.

25 April
 Prime Minister of Italy Silvio Berlusconi approves the use of Italian aircraft in ground-attack missions in Libya as part of NATOs Operation Unified Protector.

27 April
NATO airstrikes mistakenly kill 11 Libyan rebels and wound two in Misrata.

30 April
 The Syrian government deploys helicopters to Daraa in response to antiregime protests there as violence increases in the Syrian Civil War.
A NATO airstrike in Tripoli kills Libyan leader Muammar Gaddafi's son Saif al-Arab Gaddafi. The Libyan government claims that three of Said al-Arab Gaddafi's children also die in the attack.

May

1–2 May (overnight)
 In Operation Neptune Spear, two modified United States Army UH-60 Black Hawk helicopters of the 160th Special Operations Aviation Regiment (Airborne) carry United States Navy SEALs of the United States Naval Special Warfare Development Group from Jalalabad, Afghanistan, to Abbottabad, Pakistan, where they attack the compound of al-Qaeda leader Osama bin Laden, and kill him and four others in the compound. One Black Hawk crashes during the assault, but there are no serious injuries to any Americans, and the remaining Black Hawk and a CH-47 Chinook helicopter fly the SEALs and bin Ladens body back to Afghanistan.

2 May
 A remotely operated vehicle finally finds the flight recorders from Air France Flight 447 on the bottom of the Atlantic Ocean and brings them to surface after a 23-month search for them. Flight 447 had crashed on 1 June 2009.

7 May
Merpati Nusantara Airlines Flight 8968, a Xian MA60 with 25 people, crashes off the coast of West Papua, Indonesia while on approach to Kaimana Airport, killing everyone on board.

11 May
Libyan rebel forces capture Misrata Airport, which also serves as a Libyan Air Force base.
Judy Wexler becomes the first woman to pilot a human-powered helicopter, remaining airborne for four seconds and achieving an altitude of a few inches in the University of Marylands Gamera I.

13 May
A North Atlantic Treaty Organization (NATO) airstrike targeting a Libyan government command and control bunker in Brega hits a building, killing 11 civilians and wounding 45.

17 May
Its missile does not explode, and no one is injured.

18 May
 Omega Aerial Refueling Services Flight 70, a Boeing 707, veers off the runway in California following an engine separation. The aircraft is consumed by fire. Everyone survives.

19–20 May (overnight)
NATO aircraft raid Libyan Navy bases at Tripoli, Khoms, and Sirte in the largest attack against Libyan government naval forces thus far in the Libyan Civil War. During the Khoms raids, British aircraft hit two corvettes at Khoms with laser-guided bombs and damage an inflatable-boat manufacturing facility, and NATO aircraft set a warship at Tripoli afire. NATO aircraft also hit a police academy in Tripolis Tajoura neighborhood.

21 May
 NATO conducts 147 air sorties over Libya, targeting two command-and-control facilities in and near Tripoli, an ammunition storage facility near Tripoli, a naval asset near Sirte, two air defense radars near Al Khums, and a tank and a military truck near Zintan. Since NATO took command of air strikes in Libya on 31 March 31, its aircraft have conducted 2,975 strike and 4.757 other sorties.

23 May
France and the United Kingdom announce that they will begin to use attack helicopters in Libya to increase the accuracy of NATO airstrikes and allow more precise strikes against urban targets.

24 May
 NATO stages the largest air attacks against Tripoli since th beginning of the international intervention in the Libyan Civil War, with ore than 20 airstrikes hitting Tripoli near Libyan leader Muammar Gaddafi's compound. The Libyan government reports at least three people killed and dozens wounded.

26 May
The United Kingdom announces plans to send four Apache helicopters to serve in the Libyan conflict.

27 May
NATO aircraft conduct 151 sorties over Libya, striking a command and control facility in Tripoli, ammunition storage facilities near Sirte, Mizda, and Hun, a rocket launcher and two truck-mounted guns near Misrata, and four surface-to-air missile launchers near Zintan. NATO jets also destroy the guard towers surrounding Gaddafi's Bab al-Azizia compound in Tripoli. NATO aircraft have flown 8,585 sorties over Libya since NATO took command of the operations there on 31 March.
As of 27 May, a total of twenty NATO ships were actively patrolling the Central Mediterranean.

28 May

31 May
Bulgaria Air, the national airline of Bulgaria signs a lease agreement for three Embraer E-190s.
The Libyan government claims that NATO air raids have killed 718 civilians and injured more than 4,000 since the international bombing campaign to enforce a no-fly zone over Libya began.

June
2 June
NATO air attacks in Libya destroy ammunition and vehicle depots, a surface-to-air missile launcher, and a radar installation in Tripoli.

3 June
An American unmanned aerial vehicle strike in South Waziristan, Pakistan, kills Ilyas Kashmiri, a senior al-Qaeda member and leader of the Harkat-ul-Jihad al-Islami.
 NATO attack helicopters go into combat in Libya for the first time, when two British Army Air Corps AgustaWestland Apaches operating from the Royal Navy amphibious assault ship  attack a radar site and an armed checkpoint near Brega and French Aérospatiale Gazelles simultaneously attack other Libyan government targets.

4 June
 British Army Air Corps Apache attack helicopters from HMS Ocean destroy several Libyan government targets near the Brega-Ajdabiya front line, including ammunition bunkers and radar installations. French Gazelles hit numerous targets around Brega in preparation for an expected rebel ground offensive.

5 June
NATO airstrikes level the offices of Libyas state television service, Libyan Jamahiriya Broadcasting Corporation, and the Libyan government military intelligence offices in Tripoli.

9 June
The U.S. Evergreen 747 Supertanker, the world's largest firefighting aircraft, deploys to Arizona to assist in fighting the Wallow Fire.

10 June
Syrian government attack helicopters go into action during Syrian Army military operations against the rebel stronghold of Jisr ash-Shugur. The operations will conclude successfully on 12 June.
The Government of Norway announces that it will begin a gradual withdrawal of the six Royal Norwegian Air Force F-16 Fighting Falcons it has committed to Operation Unified Protector, the NATO intervention in the Libyan Civil War.

14 June
NATO aircraft strike Waddan, Libya.
In response to Libya firing rockets into its territory, Tunisia flies a helicopter and a Tunisian Air Force F-5 Freedom Fighter along its border with Libya.

14–15 June (overnight)
NATO jets resume airstrikes on Tripoli after a lull in such raids, bombarding mainly its eastern neighborhoods.

15 June
A NATO commander confirms that NATO warplanes have bombed an ammunition store at Waddan, Libya.

16 June
The Russian Federation's flag carrier Aeroflot puts its first Sukhoi Superjet 100 into service.

19 June
A NATO airstrike accidentally hits a civilian neighborhood in Tripoli, Libya. The Libyan government claims that at least five people died in the attack.

20 June
On final approach to Petrozavodsk Airport near Petrozavodsk, Russia, after a flight from Moscows Domodedovo International Airport, RusAir Flight 243, the Tupolev Tu-134A-3 RA-65691, lands short of the runway due to poor visibility and weather, killing 47 passengers and crew members and leaving all five survivors injured. The aircraft is written off.

21 June
Libyan government antiaircraft fire shoots down an unmanned NATO MQ-8 Fire Scout helicopter drone on a reconnaissance flight near Zliten, Libya.

29 June
KLM becomes the first airline in the world to provide flights using biofuel.
The French military confirms that it had air-dropped weapons in early June to Libyan rebels fighting in the highlands south of Tripoli, which Russia and the African Union in particular argue was in violation of the arms embargo against Libya under United Nations Security Council Resolution 1973.

July
Tunisair inaugurates its first service to Moscow, operating at Domodedovo Airport.

2 July
NATO confirms that in recent days it has increased its airstrikes against military targets in western Libya, bombing Tripoli and Gharyan and armored vehicles in Bir al-Ghanam.

5 July
 A Japan Air Self-Defense Force Mitsubishi F-15J based in Naha Air Base on Okinawa crashes on a training exercise on the East China Sea. Japan grounds all F-15 while investigating the cause.

6 July
 A Silk Way Airlines Ilyushin Il-76 cargo plane carrying 9 crew members crashes in Afghanistan, while on approach to Bagram Air Base, killing everyone on board.

8 July
Hewa Bora Airways Flight 952, a Boeing 727-100 crashes on approach to Bangoka International Airport, Kisangani, Democratic Republic of the Congo. 42 of the 118 people are killed.

10 July
 Egypt ends its unrestricted immigration policy for Libyan nationals arriving in Egypt by air.

11 July
Angara Airlines Flight 9007, an Antonov An-24, ditches into the Ob River, Russia, killing seven of the 37 people on board.

12 July
 An airstrip laid out along a stretch of highway near Rhebat in the Nafusa Mountains was opened by a senior NTC minister, allowing an air connection via a small private company, Air Libya, between Benghazi and the Amazigh rebels.

13 July
Noar Linhas Aéreas Flight 4896, a Let L-410UVP-E20 (registration PR-NOB) crashes near Recife, Brazil, killing all 16 people on board.

17 July
About 100 Syrian Air Force intelligence personnel defect to the rebel side in Abu Kamal, Syria.

19 July
A Royal Thai Army Sikorsky UH-60 Black Hawk helicopter crashes in Tenasserim Hills, Phetchaburi, Thailand, near the border with Myanmar, killing nine people on board.

22 July
The Space Shuttle Atlantis returns to Earth at the end of STS-135, the final mission of the Space Shuttle Program.

23 July
NATO aircraft strike a Libyan government military storage facility, a multiple rocket launcher, and a command-and-control node in the Brega area.

25 July
 NATO aircraft strike various targets in Ziltan, Libya. The Libyan government claims that they struck a health clinic, a food-storage complex, and a military base and killed at least 11 civilians. NATO later rejects the claims, saying its planes hit a command-and-control node and a vehicle storage facility.

26 July
 A Royal Moroccan Air Force Lockheed C-130 Hercules transport aircraft crashes near Guelmim, Morocco, killing all 80 people on board and becoming the deadliest aviation disaster of 2011.

28 July
Asiana Airlines Flight 991, a Boeing 747-400F crashes into the Korea Strait, killing two of its crew.
 In Senegal, the Agence Nationale de l'Aviation Civile et de la Météorologie (National Agency of Civil Aviation and Meteorology) is created by the merger of the country's national civil aviation authority, the Agence Nationale de l'Aviation Civile du Sénégal (National Agency of Civil Aviation of Senegal) with its national meteorology agency.

29 July
EgyptAir Flight 667, a Boeing 777-200ER en route from Cairo to Jeddah, Saudi Arabia suffers a fire in the cockpit while on the ground return to Cairo. All 317 people on board survive.

30 July
Caribbean Airlines Flight 523, a Boeing 737-800 overran the runway at Cheddi Jagan International Airport in Georgetown, Guyana. Seven of the 163 people suffered injuries.
NATO aircraft bomb three satellite dishes in Tripoli in an attempt to put Libyan state television – the Libyan Jamahiriya Broadcasting Corporation – off the air, but the channel continues to broadcast.
The International Organization for Migration concludes an operation that it claims airlifted 1,398 stranded migrants, mostly Chadians, out of Libya.

August
1 August
The Government of Norway announces that it has completed the withdrawal of its six F-16 Fighting Falcons from Operation Unified Protector, the NATO intervention in the Libyan Civil War. The six Royal Norwegian Air Force fighters had flown 583 of the 6,493 sorties flown by NATO aircraft since NATO took command of the Libyan air campaign on 31 March and dropped 569 bombs.

3 August
The International Federation of Journalists condemns the 30 July NATO bombing of the Libyan Jamahiriya Broadcasting Corporation in an attempt to knock Libyan state television off the air, allegedly killing three journalists and wounding another 15.

5 August
 The International News Safety Institute asks Secretary General of the United Nations Ban Ki-moon to investigate whether the 30 July NATO airstrike against the Libyan Jamahiriya Broadcasting Corporation violated a United Nations Security Council Resolution that prohibits attacks on journalists.

9 August
The Government of the United Arab Emirates turns a Libyan Air Force Ilyushin Il-76TD it had seized at Dubai over to the Libyan provisional National Transitional Council at Benghazi, Libya. It becomes the Free Libyan Air Forces first military transport aircraft.

12 August
A NATO airstrike against Libyan government positions in Brega destroys two armored vehicles and kills six Libyan Army soldiers.
The French Navy aircraft carrier Charles de Gaulle returns to Toulon, France, after more than four months of continuous operations off the coast of Libya.

15 August
The RQ-7B is completely destroyed, but the C-130 lands safely without injury to its crew. The only previous collision of a UAV with a manned aircraft had been between a U.S. Army RQ-11 Raven UAV and a U.S. Army MH-6 Little Bird helicopter over Baghdad, Iraq, in 2004.

16 August
The Government of Canada announces that the name of the Canadian Armed Forces Air Command will revert to "Royal Canadian Air Force," the name it had held as an independent armed service until 1968.

17 August
 Kaltim Airlines is founded in Samarinda by Awang F. Ishak and Sabri Ramdhani.

20 August
A Royal Air Force Red Arrows BAE Systems Hawk T.1 aerobatic team crashes during a public display at Bournemouth Air Festival, killing the pilot.
As the Battle of Tripoli begins, Libyan rebels capture Tripoli International Airport and launch an assault on Mitiga International Airport east of Tripoli.
First Air Flight 6560 – a Boeing 737-210C (registration C-GNWN) with 15 people on board arriving from Yellowknife, Northwest Territories, Canada – drifts off course in poor visibility on final approach to Resolute Bay Airport at Resolute, Nunavut, Canada, and crashes into a hill a mile from the runway, killing 12 people on board and injuring all three survivors. Recovery of the survivors and investigation of the crash are aided greatly by the ongoing Canadian Armed Forces Operation Nanook 2011, which had planned to simulate an airliner disaster in the Resolute Bay area at the time of the crash, and by the prompt arrival of Transportation Safety Board of Canada investigators, who are aboard an aircraft flying to Resolute Bay at the time of crash to take part in the planned simulation.

22 August
An American unmanned aerial vehicle strike in Pakistan conducted by the Central Intelligence Agency kills Atiyah Abd al-Rahman, a member of the Libyan Islamic Fighting Group and Ansar al-Sunna and former chief-of-staff to the deceased al-Qaeda leader Osama bin Laden.
The Government of Niger begins patrols by Niger Air Force aircraft over its border with Libya to avoid infiltration of Nigers territory by armed groups from Libya and the crossing of the border by mercenaries from the Sahel heading to Sabha, Libya, and to end the smuggling of military forces and resources out of Libya.

25 August
At Tripoli International Airport during the Battle of Tripoli, the Afriqiyah Airways Airbus A300B4-620 5A-IAY and the Libyan Arab Airlines Airbus A300B4-622 5A-DLZ are burned out and destroyed during fighting between government and rebel forces, and the Afriqiyah Airways Airbus A320 5A-ONK suffers substantial damage when an artillery shell hits its fuselage, setting it afire as well. Some reports mention an additional two aircraft destroyed, including an Afriqiyah Airways Airbus A330.

September
 The U.S. Air Force outsources all of its MQ-9 Reaper unmanned aerial vehicle operations at Seychelles International Airport on Mahé in the Seychelles, to the Jacksonville, Florida-based firm Merlin RAMCo.

2 September
 Trying to land for the third time in strong winds, a Chilean Air Force Casa C-212 Aviocar 300DF crashes into the Pacific Ocean on approach to Robinson Crusoe Island Airport on Robinson Crusoe Island in Chile's Juan Fernandez Islands, killing all 21 people on board. Popular Chilean television presenter Felipe Camiroaga is among the dead.

4 September
 At the Naval Air Station Patuxent River Air Expo in Maryland, the United States Navy's Blue Angels flight demonstration squadron uses a 50/50 blend of conventional jet fuel and a biofuel made from Camelina sativa, the first time an entire military aviation unit flies on a biofuel mix.

7 September
 A Yak-Service Yakovlev Yak-42D (registration RA-42434) fails to gain altitude on takeoff from Tunoshna Airport in Yaroslavl Oblast, Russia, and crashes  from the runway, killing 43 of the 45 people on board. Known as the 2011 Lokomotiv Yaroslavl plane crash, the Lokomotiv Yaroslavl professional ice hockey team is nearly completely killed in the crash; among the dead at the crash site are players Vitaly Anikeyenko, Mikhail Balandin, Gennady Churilov, Pavol Demitra, Robert Dietrich, Marat Kalimulin, Alexander Kalyanin, Andrei Kiryukhin, Nikita Klyukin, Stefan Liv, Jan Marek, Sergei Ostapchuk, Karel Rachůnek, Ruslan Salei, Maxim Shuvalov, Kārlis Skrastiņš, Pavel Snurnitsyn, Daniil Sobchenko, Ivan Tkachenko, Pavel Trakhanov, Yuri Urychev, Josef Vašíček, Alexander Vasyunov, Alexander Vyukhin, and Artem Yarchuk and coaches Alexander Karpovtsev, Igor Korolev, and Brad McCrimmon. The only team member to survive the immediate crash, Alexander Galimov, dies of his injuries on 12 September, leaving the airliner's avionics flight engineer as the only survivor.

14 September
The Libyan rebel National Transitional Council reports that it has captured the Libyan government military airbase at Brak.

16 September
Libyan rebel forces take control of the airport at Sirte.
 The North American P-51D Mustang The Galloping Ghost, flown by James K. "Jimmy" Leeward, crashes into box seats in front of the grandstand at the Reno Air Races at Reno Stead Airport north of Reno, Nevada. Leeward and 10 others are killed and 69 people are injured. It is the third-deadliest airshow accident in U.S. history and the deadliest aviation accident of any kind in the United States in two years.

22 September
 The United Nations lifts its sanctions against Afriqiyah Airways, allowing its aircraft to fly for the first time since the United Nations military intervention in the Libyan Civil War began in March.

26 September
 Boeing delivers its first Boeing 787 Dreamliner to a customer, All Nippon Airways, at Paine Field in Washington.

27–28 September
 All Nippon Airways flies the first delivery flight of a Boeing 787 Dreamliner, from Paine Field, Washington, to Tokyo International Airport.

30 September
Selaparang Airport at Mataram on Lombok in Indonesia closes. It is replaced by the new Lombok International Airport. 
An American unmanned aerial vehicle strike in Yemen kills Anwar al-Aulaqi, an al-Qaeda recruiter and motivator, and Samir Khan, the editor of the English-language online magazine Inspire published by al-Qaeda in the Arabian Peninsula.

October
 Libyan Airlines aircraft fly for the first time since the United Nations military intervention in the Libyan Civil War began in March, operating on the Tripoli, Libya-to-Cairo, Egypt, route.
 Meridiana Fly acquires Air Italy.
 Key West International Airport receives approval to provide commercial air service between Key West, Florida, and Cuba. It will take more than two years for charter airline operators to receive all the necessary permissions to make the first flight, which will take place on 30 December 2013 as the first commercial flight between Key West and Cuba in over 50 years.

10 October
 Flying a modified Yakovlev Yak-3U powered by a Pratt & Whitney R-2000 engine, William Whiteside sets an official international speed record for piston-engined aircraft in the under category, reaching  over a  course at the Bonneville Salt Flats in Utah in the United States, greatly exceeding the previous record of  set in 2002 by Jim Wright.
11 October
Tripoli International Airport in Tripoli, Libya, officially reopens. It had been closed since 19 March, when international forces began to enforce a no-fly zone over Libya imposed by United Nations Security Council Resolution 1973.
16 October
 Kenyan Air Force jets strike two villages in Somalia in support of a Kenyan invasion of Somalia to attack militant groups there.
21 October
The VC1 reportedly can remain airborne for 20 minutes on a single charge. The flight will win e-volo the Lindbergh Prize for advances in environmentally friendly ("green") aviation.
23 October
After the death of Muammar Gaddafi three days earlier, the Libyan Civil War ends.
26 October
 All Nippon Airways flies the first commercial flight of a Boeing 787 Dreamliner, from Tokyo to Hong Kong.
 In response to an ongoing industrial dispute with three labor unions, all Qantas aircraft are grounded by Qantas chief executive officer Alan Joyce.
31 October
The North Atlantic Treaty Organization (NATO) announces the end of Operation Unified Protector, its military operations in Libya. Since taking command of the international intervention in the Libyan civil war on 31 March, its aircraft have carried out 9,600 strike sorties and destroyed more than 1,000 tanks, vehicles, and guns, as well as the Libyan air defense and command-and-control network.

November
U.S. Air Force inspectors ground the Air Forces MQ-9 Reaper unmanned aerial vehicles based at Seychelles International Airport on Mahé in the Seychelles after discovering that the Reapers, operated by the private firm Merlin RAMCo, had not received required mechanical upgrades. The Reapers remain grounded until December.

1 November
 LOT Polish Airlines Flight 016, a Boeing 767-300ER, makes a successful belly landing at Warsaw Chopin Airport in Warsaw, Poland, after its landing gear fails to extend. None of the 231 people on board are injured.
 Switzerland's Aircraft Accident Investigation Bureau and Investigation Bureau for Railway, Funicular and Boat Accidents merge to form the Swiss Accident Investigation Board.

2 November
 American wingsuit flier Dean Potter makes the longest verified wingsuit BASE jump in terms of distance traveled, covering  in a jump from the Eiger in Switzerland.

13 November
 The Dubai-based airline Emirates orders 50 Boeing 777 airliners worth about US$18,000,000,000 – the largest order in terms of commercial value in Boeings history at the time – with an option to purchase 20 more 777s for another $8,000,000,000.

18 November
 Lion Air and Boeing sign the most valuable commercial order in history at the time, a $21,700,000,000 Lion Air order for 201 Boeing 737 MAX and 29 Boeing 737-900ER airliners. At 230 aircraft, it is also the single biggest order in history at the time for airliners in terms of the number of aircraft ordered. The deal also includes options for another 150 future aircraft for Lion Air.

 26 November
 American aircraft participating in a North Atlantic Treaty Organization (NATO)-Afghan operation against insurgents in Afghanistan near the border with Pakistan mistakenly attack a Pakistani border post, killing 24 Pakistani soldiers.

December
1 December
 A Central Intelligence Agency RQ-170 Sentinel unmanned aerial vehicle (UAV) on a reconnaissance mission malfunctions, veers out of control, and flies deep into Iran, where it runs out of fuel and crashes.

4 December
 Iran announces its capture of the CIA UAV, claiming to have shot it down. The United States acknowledges the loss of the UAV for the first time, but denies that it was shot down.
 The low-cost Thai airline Thai Lion Air, a subsidiary of Lion Air, makes its first flight, flying on the Bangkok-Chiang Mai route. It begins full service the following day.

10 December
 Thai Lion Air and Malindo Air conclude an agreement allowing both airlines to serve the Bangkok-Kuala Lumpur route. 
 A gun battle between Libyas new Libyan National Army and a powerful militia force takes place at Tripoli International Airport in Tripoli.

13 December
The engine of an unarmed, contractor-operated U.S. Air Force MQ-9 Reaper unmanned aerial vehicle fails two minutes after takeoff from Seychelles International Airport on Mahé in the Seychelles.
 Ethiopian Airlines joins the Star Alliance.

First flights

January
 11 January – Chengdu J-20 in China.
 27 January – Sonex Aircraft Onex

February
 4 February – Northrop Grumman X-47B Air Vehicle 1 (AV-1)

March
 20 March – Boeing 747-8 Intercontinental in Everett, Washington.

April
27 April – Boeing Phantom Ray

June
 24 June – Evektor EV-55 Outback

October
 21 October – e-volo VC1

December
21 December – AgustaWestland AW189

Entered service
 26 October – Boeing 787 Dreamliner with All Nippon Airways.

References

 
Aviation by year